The Allegheny County Police Department is a law enforcement agency in Allegheny County, Pennsylvania. The department provides law enforcement services to County property, including the Pittsburgh International Airport, the Allegheny County Airport, and various parks, as well as contract services to the borough of Wilmerding. It also provides assistance to all municipal law enforcement agencies, and generally investigates all serious crimes, such as homicide, except in the City of Pittsburgh.

History 
The Allegheny County Police Department was established in 1932 by an act of the Allegheny County Board of Commissioners and the Pennsylvania Legislature.

Organization 
The executive of the Allegheny County Police Department is the Superintendent, who is appointed by the County Executive, and assisted by two Assistant Superintendents. The current Superintendent is Coleman McDonough, since June 2016. The department is in turn divided into two Divisions, each commanded by an Assistant Superintendent.

Uniformed Division 

The Uniformed Division is primarily responsible for patrol of the Pittsburgh International Airport, Allegheny County Airport, nine county parks and several other county facilities and buildings.

Explosive Ordnance Disposal Team
 Explosive Ordnance Disposal K-9
 Detention Services
 Narcotic Detection K-9
 Special Weapons and Tactics Team (SWAT)
 Airport Drug Interdiction Team
Mounted Unit
 Motorcycle Detail
 Dive Unit

Detective Division 
The Detective Division is primarily responsible for investigation of crimes which occur on county property, and all serious crimes which occur within municipalities.

General Investigations
Homicide
Narcotics
 Executive Protection / Cold Case Squad
Evidence Processing Unit

Contract services
The department currently provides law enforcement services to the borough of Wilmerding.

Ranks

Fallen officers 
Since the establishment of the department, three members have died in the line of duty.

See also

Allegheny County Sheriff
Allegheny County Port Authority Police
Allegheny County Housing Authority Police
 List of law enforcement agencies in Pennsylvania
 County police

References

Airport police departments of the United States
County police departments of Pennsylvania